Spirits Having Flown is the fifteenth album released by the Bee Gees. It was the group's first album after their collaboration on the Saturday Night Fever soundtrack. The album's first three tracks were released as singles and all reached No. 1 in the US, giving the Bee Gees an unbroken run of six US chart-toppers in a one-year period and equaling a feat shared by Bing Crosby, Elvis Presley, and  The Beatles. It was the first Bee Gees album to make the UK top 40 in ten years (not counting the soundtrack for Saturday Night Fever), as well as being their first and only UK No. 1 album. Spirits Having Flown also topped the charts in Australia, Canada, Germany, New Zealand, Sweden and the US. The album has sold more than 30 million copies worldwide, making it one of the best-selling albums of all time.   

Spirits Having Flown marked the end of the band's most successful era, prior to a severe downturn in the early 1980s when they were subject to a near-total radio blackout (particularly in America) that Robin Gibb would refer to as "censorship" and "evil" in interviews.

Reprise Records remastered and re-released the album on CD in 2006, although it did not include any additional bonus tracks, demos or outtakes.

Background
At the start of 1978, Barry Gibb produced the album Shadow Dancing by Andy Gibb. In February, Barry wrote the title song for the film Grease performed by Frankie Valli; also in February, another Barry Gibb composition from 1977 "Ain't Nothing Gonna Keep Me From You" was recorded by Teri DeSario. By March, the Bee Gees had started to record this album.

Recording

Co-producer Albhy Galuten recalls Spirits Having Flown as being created primarily by Barry Gibb, Karl Richardson and himself putting in long days and nights at Criteria Studios. Blue Weaver recalls others being involved. Both agree that Robin Gibb was active behind the scenes in songwriting and offering feedback to the recording process, but Maurice Gibb contributed probably the least he did on any Bee Gees album. Not only was his alcoholism sapping his creativity, but he was having back pains finally diagnosed in 1980 as caused by a bad disk. He said that he would be doing bass work and without his knowledge, Barry and Robin would hire in someone else to play parts that he was supposed to be playing; however, he said that whilst he played fine, neither Barry nor Robin could rely on him.

In the recording phase, Robin and Maurice now mainly played the role of backing and harmony vocalists, and even in that capacity Barry did many of the vocal dubs himself as he went over and over the recorded work. Robin contributed one solo lead vocal ("Living Together") which was sung in falsetto with Barry providing alternating lead vocals in his normal register. This was Robin's least amount of lead vocals on any Bee Gees album with the exception of 1970's Cucumber Castle, for which he was not part of the group at that time. As with the last four Bee Gees albums, Maurice did not have any solo lead vocals.  While Barry is the most prominent lead vocalist on "Too Much Heaven," it features a mix of more than 20 vocal parts, including 6 tracks featuring Barry alone (3 on falsetto and 3 in chest voice) plus another 3 of Barry, Robin, and Maurice singing lead in chest voice together; while Barry is the most prominent.

The Bee Gees had been effectively typecast as a disco group after Saturday Night Fever, and in a 1978 interview Barry remarked "People think we're just about disco now. Of course that's not true. If you look at the SNF soundtrack, there's some dance music, but we also have ballads like 'More Than a Woman'." In an attempt to counter this typecasting, the first single from Spirits Having Flown was the ballad "Too Much Heaven". The horn section from Chicago (James Pankow, Walt Parazaider and Lee Loughnane) made a guest appearance on this album. At the time, they were next door working on the Chicago album Hot Streets. Thus the Bee Gees would return the favour as they appeared on Chicago's song "Little Miss Lovin'" and their keyboardist Blue Weaver appeared on "No Tell Lover". The Bee Gees also recorded "Desire" for the album but it was rejected and instead released as a solo single by their brother Andy.

Release
Spirits Having Flown was released on January 24, 1979; it was rushed two weeks early due to American radio leaks. The album was released a few weeks later in New Zealand and South American countries. In the U.S. the album was supported by full page ads in Billboard and Rolling Stone, which gave the album a lengthy and positive review. It topped the album charts in several countries, including both the US and UK. Its three singles "Tragedy", "Too Much Heaven" and "Love You Inside Out" all topped the charts in the US. The title track was also released as a single in the UK and a few other countries in December 1979 to promote the Bee Gees Greatest compilation.

Sales
The album sold more than 20 million copies worldwide as of 1997. In 2003 the BBC even gave a figure of 30 million worldwide sales. The RIAA lists the album as having been certified "platinum" (1,000,000 sold), but RSO never had the album re-certified. Many articles and websites cite the album as having sold as many as 6,000,000 copies in the U.S. alone, but these results are unofficial, which is why the album does not appear on many 'best selling' lists, including Wikipedia's list of best-selling albums.

Awards
Spirits Having Flown was voted Best Pop/Rock Album of 1979 at the 1980 American Music Awards ceremony.

Track listing
All tracks written by Barry, Robin and Maurice Gibb.

1979 North American tour

Personnel
Credits adapted from AllMusic and Joseph Brennan.

Bee Gees
Barry Gibb – lead, harmony and backing vocals, rhythm guitar
Robin Gibb – harmony and backing vocals, lead vocals on “Too Much Heaven” and “Living Together”
Maurice Gibb – harmony and backing vocals, bass guitar, keyboard, lead vocals on “Too Much Heaven”

Backing band
Alan Kendall – lead guitar
Dennis Bryon – drums
Blue Weaver – synthesiser, piano, keyboards, vibraphone, Arp

Additional personnel
Neal Bonsanti – horn
Gary Brown – saxophone
Harold Cowart – bass
Ken Faulk, Peter Graves, Bill Purse, Whit Sidener, Stan Webb – horn
Albhy Galuten – synthesiser, bass, conductor
Joe Lala, Daniel Ben Zubulon – percussion, conga
Lee Loughnane, James Pankow, Walter Parazaider – horn on “Too Much Heaven” and “Stop (Think Again)”
 Herbie Mann – flute on “Spirits (Having Flown)”
Russ Powell - guitar
George Terry – guitar
Dennis Hetzendorfer. John Blanche – assistant engineer
Mastered by George Marino at Sterling Sound, NYC

Charts

Weekly charts

Year-end charts

Certifications and sales

References

Bee Gees albums
1979 albums
Reprise Records albums
RSO Records albums
Albums produced by Barry Gibb
Albums produced by Robin Gibb
Albums produced by Maurice Gibb